The cycle of abuse is a social cycle theory developed in 1979 by Lenore E. Walker to explain patterns of behavior in an abusive relationship. The phrase is also used more generally to describe any set of conditions which perpetuate abusive and dysfunctional relationships, such as abusive child rearing practices which tend to get passed down. Walker used the term more narrowly, to describe the cycling patterns of calm, violence, and reconciliation within an abusive relationship. Critics suggest the theory was based on inadequate research criteria, and cannot therefore be generalized upon.

Overview
Lenore E. Walker interviewed 1,500 women who had been subject to domestic violence and found that there was a similar pattern of abuse, called the "cycle of abuse". Initially, Walker proposed that the cycle of abuse described the controlling patriarchal behavior of men who felt entitled to abuse their wives to maintain control over them. She used the terms "the battering cycle" and "battered woman syndrome". Terms like "cycle of abuse" have been used instead for different reasons: to maintain objectivity; because the cycle of abuse doesn't always lead to physical abuse; because symptoms of the syndrome have been observed in men and women, and are not confined to marriage and dating. Similarly, Dutton (1994) writes, "The prevalence of violence in homosexual relationships, which also appear to go through abuse cycles is hard to explain in terms of men dominating women."

The cycle of abuse concept is widely used in domestic violence programs, particularly in the United States. Critics have argued the theory is flawed as it does not apply as universally as Walker suggested, does not accurately or completely describe all abusive relationships, and may emphasize ideological presumptions rather than empirical data.

Phases
The cycle usually goes in the following order, and will repeat until the conflict is stopped, usually by the survivor entirely abandoning the relationship or some form of intervention. The cycle can occur hundreds of times in an abusive relationship, the total cycle taking anywhere from a few hours to a year or more to complete. However, the length of the cycle usually diminishes over time so that the "reconciliation" and "calm" stages may disappear, violence becomes more intense and the cycles become more frequent.

1: Tension building
Stress builds from the pressures of daily life, like conflict over children, marital issues, misunderstandings, or other family conflicts. It also builds as the result of illness, legal or financial problems, unemployment, or catastrophic events, like floods, rape or war. During this period, the abuser feels ignored, threatened, annoyed or wronged. The feeling lasts on average several minutes to hours, although it may last as long as several months.

To prevent violence, the victim may try to reduce the tension by becoming compliant and nurturing. Alternatively, the victim may provoke the abuser to get the abuse over with, prepare for the violence or lessen the degree of injury. However, the abuser is never justified in engaging in violent or abusive behavior.

2: Incident 
During this stage, the abuser attempts to dominate their victim.  Outbursts of violence and abuse occur which may include verbal abuse and psychological abuse.

In intimate partner violence, children are negatively affected by having witnessed the violence, and the partner's relationship degrades as well. The release of energy reduces the tension, and the abuser may feel or express that the victim "had it coming" to them.

3: Reconciliation
The perpetrator may begin to feel remorse, guilty feelings, or fear that their partner will leave or call the police. The victim feels pain, fear, humiliation, disrespect, confusion, and may mistakenly feel responsible.

Characterized by affection, apology, or, alternatively, ignoring the incident, this phase marks an apparent end of violence, with assurances that it will never happen again, or that the abuser will do their best to change. During this stage the abuser may feel or claim to feel overwhelming remorse and sadness. Some abusers walk away from the situation with little comment, but most will eventually shower the survivor with love and affection. The abuser may use self-harm or threats of suicide to gain sympathy and/or prevent the survivor from leaving the relationship. Abusers are frequently so convincing, and survivors so eager for the relationship to improve, that survivors (who are often worn down and confused by longstanding abuse) stay in the relationship.

4: Calm
During this phase (which is often considered an element of the honeymoon/reconciliation phase), the relationship is relatively calm and peaceful. During this period the abuser may agree to engage in counselling, ask for forgiveness, and create a normal atmosphere. In intimate partner relationships, the perpetrator may buy presents or the couple may engage in passionate sex. Over time, the abuser's apologies and requests for forgiveness become less sincere and are generally stated to prevent separation or intervention. However, interpersonal difficulties will inevitably arise, leading again to the tension building phase. The effect of the continual cycle may include loss of love, contempt, distress, and/or physical disability. Intimate partners may separate, divorce or, at the extreme, someone may be killed.

Critiques
Walker's cycle of abuse theory was regarded as a revolutionary and important concept in the study of abuse and interpersonal violence, which is a useful model, but may be simplistic. For instance, Scott Allen Johnson developed a 14-stage cycle that broke down the tension-building, acting-out and calm stages further. For instance, there are six stages in the "escalation" or tension building stage. These lead up to the assault by acting out the revenge plan, self-destructive behavior, victim grooming and the actual physical and/or sexual assault. This is followed by a sense of relief, fear of consequences, distraction, and rationalization of abuse.

Donald Dutton and Susan Golant agree that Walker's cycle of abuse accurately describes all cyclically abusive relationships they studied. Nonetheless, they also note that her initial research was based almost entirely on anecdotal data from a rather small set of women who were in violent relationships. Walker herself wrote, "These women were not randomly selected and they cannot be considered a legitimate data base from which to make specific generalizations."

See also

References

Further reading

Books
 Engel, Beverly Breaking the Cycle of Abuse: How to Move Beyond Your Past to Create an Abuse-Free Future (2005)
 Biddix, Brenda FireEagle  Inside the Pain: (a survivors guide to breaking the cycles of abuse and domestic violence) (2006)
 Hameen, Latifah Suffering In Silence: Breaking the Cycle of Abuse (2006)
 Hegstrom, Paul Angry Men and the Women Who Love Them: Breaking the Cycle of Physical and Emotional Abuse (2004)
 Herbruck, Christine Comstock Breaking the cycle of child abuse (1979)
 Marecek, Mary Breaking Free from Partner Abuse: Voices of Battered Women Caught in the Cycle of Domestic Violence (1999)
 Mills, Linda G. Violent Partners: A Breakthrough Plan for Ending the Cycle of Abuse (2008)
 Ney, Philip G. & Peters, Anna Ending the Cycle of Abuse: The Stories of Women Abused As Children & the Group Therapy Techniques That Helped Them Heal (1995)
 Pugh, Roxanne Deliverance from the Vicious Cycle of Abuse  (2007)
 Quinn, Phil E. Spare the Rod: Breaking the Cycle of Child Abuse (Parenting/Social Concerns and Issues) (1988)
 Smullens, SaraKay Setting Yourself Free :Breaking the Cycle of Emtional Abuse in Family, Friendships, Work and Love (2002)
 Waldfogel, Jane The Future of Child Protection: How to Break the Cycle of Abuse and Neglect (2001)
 Wiehe, Vernon R. What Parents Need to Know About Sibling Abuse: Breaking the Cycle of Violence  (2002)

Academic journals
 Coxe, R & Holmes, W A study of the cycle of abuse among child molesters. Journal of Child Sexual Abuse, v10 n4 p111-18 2001
 Dodge, K. A., Bates, J. E. and Pettit, G. S. (1990) Mechanisms in the cycle of violence. Science, 250: 1678-1681.
 Egeland, B., Jacobvitz, D., & Sroufe, L. A. (1988). Breaking the cycle of abuse: Relationship predictors. Child Development, 59(4), 1080-1088.
 Egeland, B & Erickson, M - Rising above the past: Strategies for helping new mothers break the cycle of abuse and neglect. Zero to Three 1990, 11(2):29-35.
 Egeland, B. (1993) A history of abuse is a major risk factor for abusing the next generation. In: R. J. Gelles and D. R. Loseke (eds) Current controversies on family violence. Newbury Park, Calif.; London: Sage.
 Furniss, Kathleen K. Ending the cycle of abuse: what behavioral health professionals need to know about domestic violence.: An article from: Behavioral Healthcare (2007)
 Glasser, M  & Campbell, D & Glasser, A & Leitch I & Farrelly S Cycle of child sexual abuse: links between being a victim and becoming a perpetrator The British Journal of Psychiatry (2001) 179: 482-494
 Kirn, Timothy F. Sexual abuse cycle can be broken, experts assert.(Psychiatry): An article from: Internal Medicine News (2008)
 Quayle, E Taylor, M  - Child pornography and the Internet: Perpetuating a cycle of abuse Deviant Behavior, Volume 23, Issue 4 July 2002, pages 331 - 361
 Stone, AE &  Fialk, RJ Criminalizing the exposure of children to family violence: Breaking the cycle of abuse 20 Harv. Women's L.J. 205, Spring, 1997
 Woods, J Breaking the cycle of abuse and abusing: Individual psychotherapy for juvenile sex Clinical Child Psychology and Psychiatry, Vol. 2, No. 3, 379-392 (1997)

Abuse
Interpersonal relationships